WNFT-LD (channel 8) is a low-power television station in Gainesville, Florida, United States, carrying several digital multicast networks operated by the E. W. Scripps Company, including Bounce TV on its primary channel. Owned by locally based Budd Broadcasting, the station maintains a transmitter near Newberry, Florida.

Subchannels
The station's digital signal is multiplexed:

References

NFT-LD
Television channels and stations established in 2011
2011 establishments in Florida
Bounce TV affiliates
Grit (TV network) affiliates
Laff (TV network) affiliates
Ion Mystery affiliates
Defy TV affiliates
TrueReal affiliates
Scripps News affiliates
Court TV affiliates
Low-power television stations in the United States